Shangguan Yunxiang (1895–8 August 1969) was a Kuomintang general from Shanghe County, Shandong. He was the brother-in-law of Kuomintang general Yu Hanmou.

Early life
Shangguan enrolled in the Infantry Division of Baoding Military Academy in 1917, and was the same class as Ye Ting and Gu Zhutong. After graduating in 1919, Shangguan served under the direct line of Sun Chuanfang, platoon leader for the guard, and was promoted all the way in Sun Army zhong. After the Beijing Coup in 1924, the Fengtian clique went south to occupy Jiangsu, and was soon expelled from the army by Sun. In 1925, with the support of Zhang Zongchang, Shi Congbin went south to attack Sun Chuanfang. Shangguan led a group of detours to the enemy, cut off Shi's retreat, and captured Shi Congbin in one fell swoop.

Service with Kuomintang
In 1927, in order to resist the Northern Expedition of the National Revolutionary Army, Sun Chuanfang shook hands with Zhang Zongchang. Zhang led the army south to support Sun Chuanfang. Because of dissatisfaction with the forces of the faction, he went south and conflicted with him, and was forced to exile in Japan.
In 1928, Shangguan returned to China and joined the National Revolutionary Army as the brigade commander of the 141st brigade of the 47th Division. In March 1929, he was promoted to the commander of the 47th Division, and in July he was promoted to the commander of the Ninth Army to participate in the Central Plains War and the siege of the Chinese Workers' and Peasants' Red Army. In 1931, in the battle of the Huangbei in Liantang during the third encirclement campaign of the Jiangxi Soviet, the Shangguan Department was hit hard. The following year, the 47th division led by the reorganization invested in the encirclement and suppression of Hubei, Henan, Anhui, and Jiangsu areas. After the Chinese Workers' and Peasants' Red Army were expelled from the Central Soviet Area in 1934, Shangguan led his army to participate in the pursuit of the Long March Red Army. In 1936, Shangguan resigned because of the corruption scandal.
On May 4, 1937, the Military Commission appointed Shangguan Yunxiang as the director of Suijing in the border areas of Henan, Hubei, and Shaanxi. After the beginning of the Second Sino-Japanese War, Shangguan served as the commander of the Eleventh Army, and was promoted to Commander-in-Chief of the 32nd Army Group the following year. In 1940, Shangguan led his department to move to the south of Anhui, and launched the Wannan Incident against the New Fourth Army early next year. Shortly thereafter, Shangguan was promoted to deputy commander of the third theater.
In 1947, Shangguan served as the deputy director of Baoding Suijing Office, and the following year as deputy commander-in-chief of the North China bandits. In 1949, Shangguan retreated to Taiwan with the National Government.
Shangguan died of illness in Taipei at the age of 74.

References

National Revolutionary Army generals from Shandong
1895 births
1969 deaths
People from Jinan
Taiwanese people from Shandong
Baoding Military Academy alumni